Saint Malachy's GAC Castledawson is a Gaelic Athletic Club from Castledawson, County Londonderry, Northern Ireland. The club is a member of Derry GAA and currently compete in gaelic football, hurling and camogie.

2017 Championship Football

History

St Malachy's GAC was set up largely thanks to Paddy Graham from the townland of Tamnadace outside the village. The Graham Cup, a reserve competition for South Derry clubs, is named in his honour. Although a relatively small club, they competed for several years in the Derry senior league.

Camogie
Castledawson fields camogie teams at U10, U12, U14, U16, Minor, and Senior levels.

Football titles

Senior
 Derry Junior Football Championship: 1
 1958
 Larkin Cup: 1
 1997
 McGlinchey Cup: 3
 2007, 2010, 2013
 Derry Intermediate Football Championship: 3
 2010, 2014, 2016
 Graham Cup: 2
 2002, 2017

Minor
Tommy O'Neill Cup: 1
2006 (shared with Foreglen)
Minor 'B' Football Championship: 1 
2015
Minor 'B' Football League: 1
2015
South Derry Minor 'B' Football Championship: 1
2006

Under-16
 South Derry Under-16 'B' Football Championship: 1
 2003, 2000
 South Derry Under-16 'B' Football League: 2
 2002, 2005

Under-14
South Derry Under-14 'B' Football Championship: 1
 2002
South Derry Under-14 'B' Football League: 1
 2002
 All County Under-14 "C"  Football Feile: 1
 2008
All County Under-14 "C" Football Championship 1
 2008

Camogie titles

 Derry Premier Camogie Championship: 1
 2007
 Derry Under-14 camogie Championship: 2
 2010, 2011

Ladies' football titles
'''U14 Derry Championship, that is no longer running:

Note: The above lists may be incomplete. Please add any other honours you know of.

Well known players

Matt Sonny McCann - Former Derry and Ulster footballer.
Dermot Heaney - 1993 All-Ireland Championship winning Derry footballer.
Adrian Heaney - Former Derry Minor, Under 21 and Senior Player who was the Senior team captain
Seamus Heaney, the 1995 laureate of the Nobel Prize in Literature played as a boy for Castledawson, the club in the area of his birth.

See also
Derry Senior Football Championship
List of Gaelic games clubs in Derry

External links
St Malachy's GAC website

References

Gaelic games clubs in County Londonderry
Gaelic football clubs in County Londonderry
Gaelic Athletic Association clubs established in 1932
1932 establishments in Northern Ireland